Rustom Jal Vakil (17 July 1911 – 20 November 1974) was a cardiologist from India who was awarded a Padma Bhushan for his contributions to medicine. He was the first Indian to win a Lasker Award.

Born in Bombay in 1911, Vakil completed his medical education in London. He pioneered the use of reserpine to control hypertension. Reserpine is derived from Indian Snakeroot, Rauwolfia serpentina, known in Bihar and Uttar Pradesh as Pagal-ki-dawa (‘‘medicine for the insane’’) Himachal Pradesh.
It was later explored as a treatment for schizophrenia.

Books authored
Clinical Diagnosis
Textbook of Medicine
The romance of healing and other essays
Heart in Health and Disease

Awards received
1958 Padma Bhushan
1959 International Albert Lasker Award
1965 Shanti Swaroop Bhatnagar Award
1969 B.C.Roy Award
1971 The V World Congress of Cardiology Souvenir Award by the Cardiological Society of India
1973 The First Dhanwantari Award

References

Indian cardiologists
Recipients of the Padma Bhushan in medicine
Parsi people from Mumbai
1911 births
1974 deaths
Recipients of the Shanti Swarup Bhatnagar Award in Medical Science
Recipients of the Lasker-DeBakey Clinical Medical Research Award
Fellows of the Royal College of Physicians
Medical doctors from Mumbai
20th-century Indian medical doctors
Parsi people
Indian expatriates in the United Kingdom